Davide Fontolan (born 24 February 1966) is an Italian former professional footballer who played as a midfielder, usually as a left winger.

Club career
Fontolan was born in Garbagnate Milanese, Province of Milan. He started his playing career with Serie C side Legnano, and moved to Parma in 1986 after four seasons with the lilla. In 1987, he played for Udinese, and from 1988 to 1990 he was part of the Genoa squad. This was followed by six seasons with Inter Milan, with 127 caps and 11 goals for the nerazzurri, where he won a UEFA Cup in 1994. He then left Inter in 1996 to join Bologna, where he played four seasons. He retired in 2001 after a season with Cagliari.

International career
Fontolan was called up once for the Italian senior national team in 1993, but never appeared for Italy.

Honours
Inter Milan
 UEFA Cup: 1991, 1994

Bologna
 UEFA Intertoto Cup: 1998

Individual
Pirata d'Oro (Internazionale Player Of The Year): 1992

References

External links
Playing career

1966 births
Living people
Sportspeople from the Metropolitan City of Milan
Association football wingers
Italian footballers
Serie A players
Serie B players
A.C. Legnano players
Genoa C.F.C. players
Udinese Calcio players
Cagliari Calcio players
Bologna F.C. 1909 players
Parma Calcio 1913 players
Inter Milan players
UEFA Cup winning players
Footballers from Lombardy